Katherine Margaret Griffith (September 10, 1915 – December 10, 2002) was an American film actress from 1936 to 1940 who appeared in Western films and serials. She made 14 films, the last being Covered Wagon Days (1940) in which she was the female lead alongside The Three Mesquiteers.

Griffith was born in Chicago and grew up in San Francisco. In 1938 she was signed by 20th Century Fox.

Griffith married actor Broderick Crawford on November 21, 1940, and made no further films herself. She had two children with Crawford but the marriage ended in divorce on July 8, 1957.

Filmography
 Easy to Take (1936) as Mary (uncredited)
 College Holiday (1936) as dancer (uncredited)

 Kentucky Moonshine (1938) as telephone operator (uncredited)
 Alexander's Ragtime Band (1938) as autograph seeker (uncredited)
 Always Goodbye (1938) as nurse (uncredited)
 My Lucky Star (1938) as Ethel
 Five of a Kind (1938) as airplane stewardess (uncredited)
 Wife, Husband and Friend (1939) as Nancy Sprague
 It Could Happen to You (1939) as minor role (uncredited)
 Hotel for Women (1939) as model (uncredited)
 Swanee River (1939) as bit role (uncredited)
 Free, Blonde and 21 (1940) as clerk (uncredited)
 Star Dust (1940) as stenographer (uncredited)
 Covered Wagon Days (1940) as Maria

References

External links
 
 

1915 births
2002 deaths
20th-century American actresses
American film actresses
Film serial actresses
Western (genre) film actresses